Nectophrynoides cryptus is a species of toad in the family Bufonidae. It is endemic to the Uluguru Mountains, Tanzania. Its natural habitat is subtropical or tropical moist lowland forests. It is threatened by habitat loss.

References

cryptus
Amphibians described in 1971
Endemic fauna of Tanzania
Amphibians of Tanzania
Taxonomy articles created by Polbot